Adubrim is a village in the Ellembelle District, a district in the Western Region of south Ghana, located near Axim in the Nzema East Municipal of the Western Region.

Geography

Location 
Adubrim is located at an elevation of 70 meters above sea level with a population of about 8,790.

References 

Populated places in the Western Region (Ghana)